Jetty Rats is a 2004 young-adult fiction novel by Phillip Gwynne. It was his fourth published book, and his third for the young-adult genre. The story follows 13-year-old Hunter Vettori and his quest to catch a mulloway – an evasive fish he has been trying to catch for his whole life. The book is set in the fictional Dogleg Bay, a place with an aging population, where the biggest business is funeral directing. 
Australian young adult novels
2004 Australian novels